A list of films produced in Russia in 2006 (see 2006 in film).

2006

See also
 2006 in Russia

External links
 Russian films of 2006 at the Internet Movie Database

2006
Films
Lists of 2006 films by country or language